AV Microscopii is a variable star in the southern constellation of Microscopium. It is a dim, red-hued star near the lower limit of visibility to the naked eye with a baseline apparent visual magnitude of 6.28. The star is located approximately 740 light years away from the Sun, based on parallax, but is moving closer with a radial velocity of −23 km/s. It is a member of the Milky Way's old disk population.

Based upon a stellar classification of M4 III, this is an aging red giant star, having exhausted the supply of hydrogen at its core then expanded to around 78 times the Sun's radius. Earlier it had been classed as M3 II, with the luminosity class of a bright giant. Samus et al. (2017) have it tentatively classified as an irregular variable of subtype LC, suggesting this is a supergiant star. It is a pulsating variable with multiple periods discovered, ranging in apparent visual magnitude between 6.25 and 6.35. The star radiates 849 times the luminosity of the Sun from its enlarged photosphere at an effective temperature of 3,539 K.

References

M-type giants
M-type bright giants
Slow irregular variables

Microscopium
Durchmusterung objects
196829
102096
Microscopii, AV